Hersha Hospitality Trust is a real estate investment trust that invests in hotels. The company is named after the wife of the founder. It is organized in Maryland, with its principal office in Harrisburg, Pennsylvania. As of December 31, 2019, the company wholly owned 38 hotels comprising 6,104 rooms and partially owned 9 hotels comprising 1,425 rooms, all of which were on either the West Coast of the United States or the East Coast of the United States.

History
In January 1979, Indian-American immigrant Hasu P. Shah and his wife, Hersha, bought an 11-room motel near Harrisburg, Pennsylvania.

In 1984, Hasu Shah formed the company and purchased a hotel in Harrisburg, Pennsylvania.

In 1998, the company was organized into a Maryland real estate investment trust and in January 1999, it became a public company via an initial public offering.

In May 2006, the company acquired 4 Boston-area hotels for $44 million.

In June 2015, the company acquired the St. Gregory Hotel in Washington, D.C. for $57 million.

In February 2016, the company sold 7 of its Manhattan hotels to a joint venture with Chinese company Cindat Capital Management. The company also acquired The Ritz-Carlton, Georgetown for $49.9 million.

References

External links

1984 establishments in Maryland
1999 initial public offerings
Real estate companies established in 1984
Financial services companies established in 1984
Companies listed on the New York Stock Exchange
Real estate investment trusts of the United States